Top Rank Suite was the name given to a chain of nightclubs in the United Kingdom owned by the Rank Organisation. They were sometimes known as Top Rank Ballrooms.

Venues

Brighton

The Brighton Top Rank Suite opened in October 1965. It was rebranded in 1973 plus referb and called KingsWest.  It was refurbished in 1990 and renamed the Event, and then refurbished and renamed Event II in 1996. In 2007 another refurbishment led to it reopening as Oceana, and later as Pryzm.

Cardiff
The Cardiff Top Rank Suite opened in 1963 on Queen Street in the centre of the city. It hosted acts such as The Beatles, Led Zeppelin and U2. The Top Rank closed in 1982 but the venue continued under a series of names until the building was demolished in 2005.

Croydon
The 1960s saw the Top Rank active in Croydon. During the following decade it was rebranded as Cinatra's, which was an equally popular venue for many years. The reputation of the club began to decline in the 1990s, and eventually so did its trade. Cinatra's closed its doors for the final time in 2004 & has been vacant & boarded up ever since.

Doncaster
The Doncaster Top Rank Suite was on Silver Street from 1964 to 1974.

Hanley, Stoke-on-Trent

Situated on the corner of Cheapside and Albion Square opposite the Hanley Town Hall the Top Rank Suite and Ballroom opened on 03/02/1965 at 12 noon with the official opening by The Lord Mayor of Stoke-on-Trent, Alderman J. E. Hulme J.P. This was then followed on 05/02/1965 with an opening “CHARITY BALL” where Evening Dress was required and was In Aid of Rotary Charities. It advertised Dancing from 8.00pm - 2.00am, Tickets were strictly limited at a cost of 30 shillings and this price  included a buffet and music provided by two bands with a Cabaret and Fully Licensed Bars. It remained a popular venue and continued until it closed in 1974. 
After it’s closure it became Baileys Club in the same year until it’s closure in 1977.

Reading
The Reading Top Rank Ballroom opened in October 1967, with the building being demolished in 2015 to make way for the Station Hill redevelopment.

Sheffield
The Sheffield Top Rank opened in 1968 on Arundel Gate, before becoming the Roxy Disco in 1985. The venue still exists as a destination for live music, and is now part of the O2 Academy Group.

Southampton
The Southampton Top Rank opened in the mid 1960s, was renamed The Mayfair, and closed in the late 1980s.

Swansea
The Swansea Top Rank was built by the Rank Organisation in 1967, and was initially a cinema. In 1972, Les Harvey, the guitarist and co-founder of the band Stone the Crows, died after being electrocuted on the stage of the club. The club operated under several names before the building was demolished in 2016.

Watford
The Watford Top Rank Suite still operates as a nightclub. It was subsequently renamed Bailey's, then Paradise Lost, Kudos, Destiny, Oceana, and most recently Pryzm.

In popular culture
 Althea & Donna's 1977 single "Uptown Top Ranking".
 Derek and Clive's "Top Rank" sketch on Derek and Clive (Live). (transcript)
 The Moody Blues track "Top Rank Suite" on their 1978 album Octave

References

Music venues in England
Former music venues in Cardiff